Villaverla is a town in the province of Vicenza, Veneto, Italy. It is west of SP349 and south of A31.

Origins
From Roman times, the original name of the nearby village that eventually became Villaverla was "Roveredum."  The center of that first village was likely located in the area where April 25th Road and Roare Road intersect, suggested by archaeological finds at an old brickyard nearby (Roman coins and traces of arched brick walls of Roman origin.)

Around 1004 AD, Giovanni Verla (Giovanni of Werla) and perhaps other of his family members, came from the area of Werlaburgdorf Germany with Holy Roman Emperor Henry II in a military campaign to put down a revolt by Arduin, Marquis of Ivrea. Giovanni and his relatives (originally referred to as the Werlas, later as Verlas or Verlatti, and today Verlato) were subsequently granted land by the Emperor in the towns of Thiene, Zane and what was then Roveredum. 

The name "Villaverla" literally means "Village of the Verla." This was a reflection of both the influence that the Verlato family had at the time and the manner in which the family was referred to (i.e. Verla or Verlatti) during the time the modern town's name was being adopted.  The name Villaverla began to be adopted around the end of the 13th century and was well established by around 1663 when Pagliarino wrote his history of the area.

A villa/palazzo for the Verlato family (Today known as the "Villa Verlato") was completed in Villaverla around 1574, and was designed by renowned architect Vicenzo Scamozzi   This most likely influenced both the future physical development of the town as well as the adoption of the name Villaverla in the place of Roveredum.  The Villa Verlato has survived the centuries and is located today in the center of the town at 9 Piazza del Popolo.

Twin towns
Villaverla is twinned with:

  Tuglie, Italy, since 2006

People
Elia Dalla Costa, cardinal

Website
http://www.comune.villaverla.vi.it/web/villaverla/

Sources

(Google Maps)

Cities and towns in Veneto